The 2017 Wicklow Senior Football Championship is the 117th edition of the Wicklow GAA's premier club Gaelic football tournament for senior graded teams in County Wicklow, Ireland. The tournament consists of 13 teams with the winner going on to represent Wicklow in the Leinster Senior Club Football Championship. The championship consists of a back door system.

Baltinglass were the defending champions after they defeated St. Patrick's in the previous years final.

This was Arklow Geraldines-Ballymoney's return to the top flight after claiming last season's I.F.C. title.

Team changes
The following teams have changed division since the 2016 championship season.

To S.F.C.
Promoted from 2016 Wicklow Intermediate Football Championship
 Arklow Geraldines-Ballymoney  -  (Intermediate Champions)

From S.F.C.
Relegated to 2017 Wicklow Intermediate Football Championship
 Aughrim
 Hollywood
 St. Boden's

From S.F.C.
Discontinued Amalgamation
 North District

Group stage
There are three groups of six teams called Group A, B and C. The 3 top finishers in Group A and 2 finishers in Groups B and C qualify for the quarter-finals. The third placed team in Group B and C will play off for a place in the quarter-finals. The bottom finishers of each group will qualify for the relegation play-off.

Group A

Round 1
 Tinahely 2-13, 1-11 Bray Emmets, Aughrim Park, 29/6/2017 Report
 Kiltegan 2-13, 2-11 Blessington, Aughrim Park, 2/7/2017 Report
 Arklow Geraldines-Ballymoney - Bye,

Round 2
 Blessington 6-18, 1-7 Bray Emmets, Aughrim Park, 14/7/2017 Report
 Arklow Geraldines-Ballymoney 4-8, 1-10 Tinahely, Aughrim Park, 16/7/2017, Report
 Kiltegan - Bye,

Round 3
 Arklow Geraldines-Ballymoney 1-12, 1-10 Blessington, Aughrim Park, 29/7/2017, 
 Kiltegan 2-14, 0-7 Bray Emmets, Aughrim Park, 30/7/2017,
 Tinahely - Bye,

Round 4
 Kiltegan 2-11, 0-11 Arklow Geraldines-Ballymoney, Aughrim Park, 12/8/2017,
 Blessington 1-15, 0-4 Tinahely, Aughrim Park, 12/8/2017,
 Bray Emmets - Bye,

Round 5
 Arklow Geraldines-Ballymoney 4-7, 2-11 Bray Emmets, Aughrim Park, 25/8/2017,
 Kiltegan 4-22, 1-8 Tinahely, Baltinglass, 27/8/2017,
 Blessington - Bye,

Group B

Round 1
 Avondale 4-3, 1-12 Newtown, Ashford, 2/7/2017, Report
 Éire Óg Greystones 0-12, 0-11 Annacurra, Ashford, 2/7/2017,

Round 2
 Éire Óg Greystones 1-16, 2-10 Avondale, Arklow, 30/7/2017,
 Annacurra 1-12, 0-7 Newtown, Arklow, 30/7/2017,

Round 3
 Éire Óg Greystones 1-22, 0-10 Newtown, Ashford, 11/8/2017,
 Avondale 2-13, 3-8 Annacurra, Aughrim Park, 11/8/2017,

Group C

Round 1
 Rathnew 1-13, 1-8 Coolkenno, Aughrim Park, 1/7/2017,
 Baltinglass 0-10, 0-10 St Patrick's, Aughrim Park, 2/7/2017,

Round 2
 St Patrick's 2-7, 0-8 Rathnew, Aughrim Park, 15/7/2017, Report
 Baltinglass 3-11, 1-8 Coolkenno, Aughrim Park, 30/7/2017, Report

Round 3
 St Patrick's 2-15, 1-4 Coolkenno, Aughrim Park, 4/8/2017,
 Rathnew 3-10, 4-7 Baltinglass, Aughrim Park, 13/8/2017,

Keating Trophy/Relegation play-off
The five teams who failed to reach the quarter-finals enter the Keating Trophy. These teams play each other in a round robin basis. The top two finishers proceed to the Keating Trophy final while the two bottom finishers will be relegated to the 2018 I.F.C.

Round 1:
 Coolkenno 0-12, 1-5 Tinahely, 16/9/2017,
 Bray Emmets 3-8, 0-12 Newtown, 19/9/2017,
 Annacurra - Bye,

Round 2:
 Tinahely 2-12, 1-11 Annacurra, 23/9/2017,
 Bray Emmets 1-11, 0-10 Coolkenno, 24/9/2017,
 Newtown - Bye,

Round 3:
 Newtown 1-13, 0-13 Coolkenno, 6/10/2017,
 Annacurra 1-14, 0-8 Bray Emmets, 8/10/2017,
 Tinahely - Bye,

Round 4:
 Annacurra 1-10, 0-11 Newtown, 4/11/2017,
 Bray Emmets 1-8, 1-8 Tinahely, 4/11/2017,
 Coolkenno - Bye,

Round 5:
 Newtown 2-13, 2-9 Tinahely, 28/10/2017,
 Annacurra 1-13, 1-8 Coolkenno, 28/10/2017, 
 Bray Emmets - Bye.

Final
 Annacurra 1-16, 3-7 Bray Emmets, Arklow, 11/11/2017,

Knock-out Stages

Quarter-Final play-off

Quarter-finals

Semi-finals

Final

Leinster Senior Club Football Championship

References

Wicklow Senior Football Championship